Galaxy21 Music is a record label founded in 2001 by Dan and Lisa Michaels.

Artists
Adam Again
The Choir
Common Children
Daniel Amos
Dead Artist Syndrome
Riki Michele
The 77s
Undercover

See also
 List of record labels

Christian record labels
American independent record labels
Record labels established in 2001
Rock record labels
Companies based in Tennessee